Boris Vasilyevich Shchukin (Moscow — 7 October 1939, Moscow) was a Russian and Soviet actor, theater director and pedagogue. In 1936, Shchukin was among the first group of recipients of the honorary title of People's Artist of the USSR. In 1941, he was posthumously awarded the Stalin Prize. He was most famous for his portrayals of Vladimir Lenin. On October 7, 1939, Shchukin died of cardiovascular disease in Moscow.

Filmography
 Lyotchiki (1935) as Nikolai Rogachyov, commander of aviation school
Generation of Winners (1936) as Aleksandr Mikhailov
 Lenin in October (1937) as Vladimir Lenin
 Lenin in 1918 (1939) as Vladimir Lenin

References

External links
 

1894 births
1939 deaths
Male actors from Moscow
People from Moskovsky Uyezd
Russian drama teachers
Russian male film actors
Russian male stage actors
Soviet drama teachers
Soviet male film actors
Soviet male stage actors
Soviet theatre directors
20th-century Russian male actors
Vladimir Lenin
Russian military personnel of World War I
Soviet military personnel of the Russian Civil War
People's Artists of the USSR
Honored Artists of the RSFSR
Stalin Prize winners
Recipients of the Order of Lenin
Burials at Novodevichy Cemetery